Benjamin Ray Zambiasi (born  August 19, 1956) is a former linebacker for the University of Georgia and in the Canadian Football League.

Zambiasi was born in Valdosta, Georgia, and attended high school at Mount de Sales Academy in Macon playing on three state championship football teams there.  He played for the Georgia Bulldogs from 1974 to 1977. While at Georgia Zambiasi led the Bulldogs with 467 career tackles tackling 173 in 1977. He later graduated from the University of Georgia in 1980 with a Bachelor of Arts (A.B.) degree. He was drafted by the NFL's Chicago Bears in the 10th round, 271st overall, in 1978, but ended up coming to Canada after training camp.

Zambiasi played 10 years with the Hamilton Tiger-Cats (1978–1987) and one year with the Toronto Argonauts (1988). He played in 4 Grey Cup games winning one championship in the 74th Grey Cup. He won the CFL's Most Outstanding Defensive Player Award in 1979 and was an all star 8 times. He was selected to the University of Georgia Bulldogs' Team of the Century and the Hamilton Tiger-Cats Wall of Honour in 2002. He was inducted into the Canadian Football Hall of Fame in 2004. In 2014 Zambiasi was inducted into the Georgia-Florida game Hall of Fame.

References

1956 births
Living people
American players of Canadian football
Hamilton Tiger-Cats players
Canadian Football Hall of Fame inductees
Canadian Football League Most Outstanding Defensive Player Award winners
Canadian football linebackers
Toronto Argonauts players
Georgia Bulldogs football players
University of Georgia alumni
People from Valdosta, Georgia
Canadian Football League Rookie of the Year Award winners